DMCC is a rapid transit station on the Red Line of the Dubai Metro in Dubai, UAE.

The station opened on 15 October 2010 as Jumeirah Lakes Towers, along  with four other intermediate stations on the Red Line. The station is named after Dubai Multi Commodities Centre.

Location
Despite its name, DMCC station is situated at the southern end of both the Jumeirah Lakes Towers and Dubai Marina developments, the former to the east and the latter to the west of the station. It is the closest Metro stop to many well-known buildings, including Almas Tower.

Station layout
DMCC station lies on a viaduct paralleling the eastern side of Sheikh Zayed Road. It is characterised as a type 2 elevated station, indicating that it utilises a side platform setup with two tracks and an elevated concourse between street and platform level. Pedestrian access is aided by skybridges across Sheikh Zayed Road, with entrances near Indigo Tower to the east and Horizon Tower to the left.

Developments
During January 2018 to April 2019, the Red Line between the DMCC and Ibn Battuta stations was closed for an extension to the Dubai Metro system. The station acted as the western terminus for trains from Rashidiya, due to the suspension of the Red Line between Jumeirah Lake Towers and Ibn Batutta to enable the layout at the Nakheel Harbour & Tower, in order to accommodate the Expo 2020 extension. A crossover to the west of the station facilitated the reversal of trains.

References

Railway stations in the United Arab Emirates opened in 2010
Dubai Metro stations